Taste receptor type 2 member 3 is a protein that in humans is encoded by the TAS2R3 gene.

Function 

This gene encodes a member of a family of candidate taste receptors that are members of the G protein-coupled receptor superfamily and that are specifically expressed by taste receptor cells of the tongue and palate epithelia. These apparently intronless taste receptor genes encode a 7-transmembrane receptor protein, functioning as a bitter taste receptor. This gene is clustered with another 3  candidate taste receptor genes in chromosome 7 and is genetically linked to loci that influence bitter perception.

Ligands
The only known ligand for TAS2R3 in BitterDB is chloroquine.

See also
 Taste receptor

References

Further reading

Human taste receptors